Season ten of Dancing with the Stars premiered on March 22, 2010, on the ABC network.

The Pussycat Dolls singer Nicole Scherzinger and Derek Hough won the competition, while Olympic figure skater Evan Lysacek and Anna Trebunskaya finished second, and ESPN host Erin Andrews and Maksim Chmerkovskiy finished third.

Cast

Couples
This season had eleven contestants. Damian Whitewood, from the Broadway dance revue Burn the Floor, joined the cast of professionals this season. Ashly DelGrosso Costa, whose last season as a pro was season three, also returned, and Edyta Śliwińska continued as the longest-tenured professional on the show, having appeared on all of the first ten seasons.

Future appearances
Pamela Anderson returned for the All-Stars season, where she was paired with Tristan MacManus.

Host and judges
Samantha Harris did not return as co-host for this season due to her commitments on The Insider and Entertainment Tonight. On March 8, 2010, Tom Bergeron announced on Good Morning America that his new co-host would be season seven champion Brooke Burke. Len Goodman, Bruno Tonioli, and Carrie Ann Inaba all returned as judges.

Scoring charts

Notes

 : Each couple each couple received two scores from the judges this week: one for technical and one for performance.
 : This was the lowest score of the week.
 : This was the highest score of the week.
 :  This couple finished in first place.
 :  This couple finished in second place.
 :  This couple finished in third place.
 :  This couple was in the bottom two, but was not eliminated.
 :  This couple was eliminated.

Highest and lowest scoring performances 
The highest and lowest performances in each dance according to the judges' 30-point scale are as follows.

Couples' highest and lowest scoring dances
Scores are based upon a potential 30-point maximum.

Weekly scores
Individual judges' scores in the charts below (given in parentheses) are listed in this order from left to right: Carrie Ann Inaba, Len Goodman, Bruno Tonioli.

Week 1: First Dances
Each couple performed either the cha-cha-cha or Viennese waltz. Couples are listed in the order they performed.

Week 2: First Elimination 
Each couple performed either the foxtrot or jive. Couples are listed in the order they performed.

Week 3: Story-telling Week
Each couple performed either the paso doble, quickstep, or waltz. Couples are listed in the order they performed.

Week 4: Double-score Week
Each couple performed either the rumba or tango, receiving two sets of scores from the judges: one for technical and one for performance. Couples are listed in the order they performed.

Week 5: Movie Week
Each couple performed one unlearned dance. Couples are listed in the order they performed.

Week 6: Marathon Week
Each couple performed either the Argentine tango or samba, plus a swing dance marathon for extra points. Couples are listed in the order they performed.

Week 7: Team Dance Week
Each couple performed one unlearned dance, plus a team cha-cha-cha. Couples are listed in the order they performed.

Week 8: Race to the Semifinals
Each couple performed two unlearned dances, the second of which had to reflect the style of a particular era. Couples are listed in the order they performed.

Week 9: Semifinals
Each couple performed two unlearned dances. Couples are listed in the order they performed.

Week 10: Finals
On the first night, the three couples performed three dances: a redemption dance selected by one of the judges, which was a style they had already performed earlier in the competition, plus a freestyle dance, and then their favorite dance, which for all three was the Argentine tango. Couples are listed in the order they performed. On the second night, the two remaining couples performed one final dance.

Night 1

Night 2

Dance chart 
The celebrities and professional partners danced one of these routines for each corresponding week:
 Week 1 (First Dances): One unlearned dance (cha-cha-cha or Viennese waltz)
 Week 2 (First Elimination): One unlearned dance (foxtrot or jive)
 Week 3 (Story Week): One unlearned dance (paso doble, quickstep, or waltz)
 Week 4 (Double-scoring Week): One unlearned dance (rumba or tango)
 Week 5 (Movie Week): One unlearned dance 
 Week 6 (Marathon Week): One dance (Argentine tango or samba) & swing dance marathon 
 Week 7 (Team Dance Week): One unlearned dance & team dances 
 Week 8 (Race to Semifinals): Two unlearned dances 
 Week 9 (Semifinals): Two unlearned dances 
 Week 10 (Night 1, Semifinals): Judges' choice dance, freestyle & favorite dance
 Week 10 (Night 2, Finals): Dance-off

Notes

 :  This was the highest scoring dance of the week.
 :  This was the lowest scoring dance of the week.
 :  This couple danced, but received no scores.

Ratings

References

External links 

Dancing with the Stars (American TV series)
2010 American television seasons